Bertolé is an Argentinian surname. Notable people with this surname include:

 Cora María Bertolé de Cané (1923–2016), Argentinian journalist, librettist, and writer
 Emilia Bertolé (1896–1949), Argentinian poet and painter

See also
 Bertoli

Spanish-language surnames